Misis Bridge is a Roman bridge in Adana Province, Turkey.  (Misis is the popular name of Yakapınar town, which is now included in Greater Adana)

Geography
Presently it is on the road which connects the main highway  to Mediterranean Sea coast.

History
In the Middle Ages, Mopsuestia was a big city and the bridge was built on one of the most active trade roads to east. It was commissioned by the Roman emperor Flavius Julius Constantius (better known as Constantius II) in the fourth century. It was restored by the Byzantine emperor Justinian I in the sixth century. It was again renovated in 743 and 840. The bridge suffered damage in the 1998 Adana–Ceyhan earthquake, but it was restored.

Details
The building material is face stone.  There are nine arches. After the last restoration following the earthquake it is still in use.

Trivia
According to a popular legend, Luqman who had discovered the elixir of life dropped the receipt and the herbs from Misis Bridge.

See also 
 List of Roman bridges

References

Bridges in Adana
Roman bridges in Turkey
Bridges completed in the 4th century
Road bridges in Turkey
Arch bridges in Turkey
Buildings and structures in Adana Province
Buildings of Justinian I
Stone arch bridges